Bapulal Nayak (25 March 1879 – 4 December 1947) was an Indian stage actor, director and manager of the early Gujarati theatre. Born into a family of traditional folk theatre performers, he joined the theatre company Mumbai Gujarati Natak Mandali at a young age. His acting was well received in his initial roles. He was involved in stage planning and managing and later became a partner in the company. He rose to fame and acted in several successful plays with Jaishankar Bhojak 'Sundari', who played female roles opposite him. He acted in plays written by Mulshankar Mulani, Gajendrashnakar Pandya and Nrisinh Vibhakar. He wrote and directed several plays and eventually bought the theatre company. After a career lasting five decades, he retired after his company suffered heavy loss with the advent of the cinema.

Biography

Nayak was born in Gerita near Mehsana on 25 March 1879 and was named Narayan by his parents Bhabhaldas Khemchand Nayak and Narbhiben. He studied till the fifth standard in the Gujarati school in his native village Undhai. He was nicknamed Bapulal by his father. In Februatry 1890, at the age of eleven, he quit the family tradition of performing Bhavai (folk theatre) and farming, and started his stage career with Dayashankar Visanji Bhatt's Mumbai Gujarati Natak Mandali for a salary of three rupees per month.  He was given a role of Jayant, son of Indra, in a play, Harishchandra (1890). He next appeared in Rajbeej (King's Progeny, 1891), a play written by Mulshankar Mulani specifically for him which premiered at the Geity Theatre in Bombay. It was successful. His performance as Mularaja in Mularaj Solanki (1895) was well received. In the next decade, he acted Ramcharitra (1989), Raman in Lakshadhipati-no Raman, Jayraj (1898) and other plays,  as well as becoming involved in stage planning and the management of a theatre company. In 1899, he and Mulani became partners in the company, each holding a 6% share of the Mumbai Gujarati Natak Mandali. He also acted in the acclaimed play, Ajabkumari (1899), opposite female impersonator actor Jaishankar Bhojak 'Sundari' who had recently joined their company. The pair soon rose to fame and acted together in several successful plays including Saubhagya Sundari (Fortunate Sundari, 1901), Vikram Charitra (1901, directed by him), Dage Hasrat (1901), Jugal Jugari (Jugal the Gambler, 1903), Kamlata (1904), Sneh Sarita (1915), Madhubansari (1917). Around the end of the 19th-century, he was guided by Mulshankar and Dayashankar Visanji. He learned direction from Sorabji Katrak. He trained many actors as well.

Nand-Batrisi (1906) was a first play written by him which was well received. He also wrote Chandrabhaga (1909), a farce entitled Navalsha Hirji (1909), Anandlahari (1919) and Saubhagya-no Sinh (1925). When Mulani's three plays failed consequently, he chose to stage nationalistic plays written by Nrisinh Vibhakar. These plays experimented with story and theme but enactment stayed unchanged. During this period, Mahatma Gandhi had arrived in India from South Africa and the Indian independence movement was gathering steam. He acquired Mumbai Gujarati Natak Mandali in April 1922.

Bapulal Nayak started directing his plays and started adapting literature into plays. He chose Ramanbhai Neelkanth's play Raino Parvat written in 1911 and staged it in 1926. The songs of the play were written by Rasiklal Parikh and four shows of it were staged. Later he staged four plays written by Champshi Udeshi, four plays written by Gajendrashankar Pandya as well as many Parsi theatre styled plays. Gajendrashankar Pandya's play College Kanya was staged by Bapulal and it created controversy due to some of its dialogue about females; Narsinhrao Divetia, Chandravadan Mehta and Hansa Jivraj Mehta led the public protests against the play.

With the advent of the cinema, the theatre started to lose its audience. Bapulal was forced to sell his company in 1938 due to it suffering heavy losses. In 1944, he tried to revive his company with the help of a financier. He retired after staging his last play Ladakvayo, written by Prafulla Desai, in 1946. He had acted in more than a hundred plays, directed forty seven plays and written six plays during his career. He also wrote some poems. He died on 4 December 1947 in Undhai near Mehsana, Baroda State.

Reception
P. K. Nayyar, a columnist of Sanjvartaman daily of Bombay, called him the "one of the best actors in the world" in 1917. Rasiklal Parikh, Chandravadan Mehta and Pragji Dosa have praised the excellence of his directing.

Stage

References

Further reading

 

Indian male stage actors
Indian theatre directors
Indian male dramatists and playwrights
Indian male musical theatre actors
Gujarati theatre
1879 births
1947 deaths
Gujarati people
20th-century Indian dramatists and playwrights
Male actors from Gujarat
20th-century Indian male actors
Dramatists and playwrights from Gujarat
20th-century Indian male writers
Gujarati-language writers